Édouard Jacobs (born 1851 in Halle, Belgium; died 1925) was a Belgian cellist. He was a pupil of Joseph Servais (a son of Adrien-François Servais), at the Brussels Conservatory. He played in the Weimar court orchestra for some years. In 1885 he succeeded his teacher as cello professor at the Brussels Conservatory. He also played viol da gamba in concerts of early music. Among his pupils was Fernand Quinet.

References

1851 births
1925 deaths
Belgian classical cellists
19th-century Belgian musicians
19th-century Belgian male musicians
20th-century Belgian musicians
20th-century Belgian male musicians
Royal Conservatory of Brussels alumni
Academic staff of the Royal Conservatory of Brussels
20th-century cellists